Muyiwa Ademola (born 26 January 1973), also known as Muyiwa Authentic, is a Nigerian actor, film producer, and director.
In 2005, his film ORI (Fate) won the best indigenous film at the 1st Africa Movie Academy Awards. In 2008, he was nominated for the 4th Africa Movie Academy Awards for Most Outstanding Indigenous Actor.

Early life
He was born on 26 January 1971 in Abeokuta, the capital of Ogun State southwestern Nigeria.
He attended St. David's High School at Molete in Ibadan where he obtained the West Africa Secondary School Certificate. He later proceeded to the University of Ibadan where he obtained a Bachelor of Education degree in adult education.

Career
He joined the Nigerian film industry through Charles Olumo, popularly known as Agbako who based in his hometown, Abeokuta. He later met a movie director called S.I Ola who taught him acting and movie production.
He began his acting career fully in 1991. In 1995, he produced his first script into a movie titled Asise (Blunder). The production was sponsored by Dibel, who deals in generating sets.
Since 1995, he has produced, directed and featured in several Yoruba Nollywood movies.
In January 2013, it was reported that he was involved in an accident, which almost resulted in his death. He is managed by Adenekan Mayowa.

Personal life
Ademola married a woman named Omolara Ademola in June 23, 2006, and they have three children together. He also has a set of twins outside wedlock, which makes him a father to five children. His wife and all his children live in Toronto, Canada.

Selected filmography
Asise (1995)
Ogo Osupa 
Ori (2004)
Ile
Alapadupe 
Ami Ayo
Fimidara Ire
Gbarada (2019)
Iranse Aje
J.J.''

See also
4th Africa Movie Academy Awards
List of Yoruba people
List of Nigerian actors

References

External links
 

Living people
1953 births
Nigerian male film actors
20th-century Nigerian male actors
Yoruba male actors
Male actors in Yoruba cinema
University of Ibadan alumni
Male actors from Abeokuta
Nigerian male television actors
Nigerian film directors
People from Ogun State
Nigerian film producers